Semora is an unincorporated community in Caswell County, North Carolina, United States. It lies just northwest of Hyco Lake and has some presence in Person County. Semora is home to one of the oldest churches in North Carolina, the Red House Presbyterian Church.

Neighboring North Carolina communities and municipalities include: Yanceyville, Milton, Roxboro, Leasburg, and Blanch. Alton, Virginia is a neighbor to the north.

The population was 1,716 at the 2010 census.

In addition to the Red House Presbyterian Church, Wildwood is listed on the National Register of Historic Places.

References

Unincorporated communities in Caswell County, North Carolina
Unincorporated communities in Person County, North Carolina
Unincorporated communities in North Carolina